Cottonwood Spring, located at Blue Diamond, Nevada, (formerly known as Ojo de Cayetana, or Pearl Spring), was a watering place and camp site on the Old Spanish Trail and then later on the Mormon Road between Mountain Springs and Las Vegas Springs.

References

Old Spanish Trail (trade route)
Mormon Road
Bodies of water of Clark County, Nevada
Springs of Nevada